The Critics' Choice Movie Award for Best Actress in an Action Movie is a retired award that was handed out to people working in the motion picture industry by the Broadcast Film Critics Association at their annual Critics' Choice Movie Awards from 2012 to 2016. The category was revived in 2020 at the 1st Critics' Choice Super Awards.

List of winners and nominees

2010s

2020s

Multiple nominees

2 nominations
 Scarlett Johansson

3 nominations
 Emily Blunt

4 nominations
 Jennifer Lawrence

A
Film awards for lead actress